General Sir John Bell  (1 January 1782 – 20 November 1876) was a British soldier and magistrate. At the time of his death, he was the senior general of the British Army.

Background
Born at Bonytoun in the county of Fife, he was the son of David Bell and Janet Duncan. After attending Dundee Academy, he worked first as a merchant and in 1805 entered the British Army as an ensign of the 52nd (Oxfordshire) Regiment of Foot. Bell was known as a witty raconteur, and gifted artist and draughtsman.

Career
He went to Sicily a year later and subsequently took part in the Peninsular War until 1814. During this time, he was decorated with the Army Silver Medal with six clasps and received the Army Gold Cross. Bell was wounded in the Battle of Vimeiro in 1808 and was in the war's last years assistant quartermaster-general. In December 1814, he was transferred with his regiment to the United States and was involved in the Anglo-American War until the beginning of the following year. After his return to England, he was awarded a Companion of the Order of the Bath.

Bell was sent to the Cape of Good Hope as deputy quartermaster-general in 1821 and served as chief secretary to the colony's government from 1828. At that time his nephew Charles Davidson Bell held the post of Surveyor-General in the Cape Colony. He was appointed an aide-de-camp to King William IV of the United Kingdom in 1831 and was promoted to major-general in 1841. He joined the board of general officers in 1847 and was nominated Lieutenant Governor of Guernsey in the following year, holding that office until 1854.

Bell took command of the 95th (Derbyshire) Regiment of Foot in 1850 and became a lieutenant-general in 1851. A year later, he was advanced to a Knight Commander of the Bath. In 1853, he received colonelship of the 4th (The King's Own) Regiment of Foot, a command he held until his death in 1876. Bell was further honoured with the Order's Grand Cross in the 1860 Birthday Honours and was promoted to general in June.

Family
In 1821, he married Catherine, eldest daughter of James Harris, 1st Earl of Malmesbury. His wife was born in St Petersburg and a godchild of Empress Catherine I of Russia. She died at Upper Hyde Park Street in London in 1855. Bell survived her until 1876, when he died, aged 92, at Cadogan Place. He was interred on Kensal Green Cemetery.

References

1782 births
1876 deaths
Military personnel from Fife
People educated at the High School of Dundee
Knights Grand Cross of the Order of the Bath
Recipients of the Army Gold Cross
British Army generals
British Army personnel of the War of 1812
52nd Regiment of Foot officers
British Army personnel of the Napoleonic Wars
Burials at Kensal Green Cemetery